Bobbi-Jo Slusar (born June 6, 1985) is a Canadian ice hockey player.

Born in Swift Current, Saskatchewan, Slusar was a member of the Canada women's national ice hockey team from 2006 to 2008. Currently, she played for the Brampton Thunder in the Canadian Women's Hockey League (CWHL) and competed in the 2010 Clarkson Cup. During the 2010–11 season, she competed for the Strathmore Rockies of the WWHL. She was drafted 9th overall by the Team Alberta CWHL in the 2011 CWHL Draft.

Playing career
Slusar played for Team Western in 2000. The following year, Slusar claimed a bronze medal with Team West at the 2001 National Women's Under 18 challenge. In 2002, she helped Notre Dame win the provincial Midget AAA championship. During the same year, Slusar participated with Saskatchewan at the 2002 Esso Women's Nationals finishing fifth. In addition, Slusar was the captain of the Saskatchewan Provincial Team in 2003. She captained Saskatchewan to a bronze medal at the 2003 Canada Winter Games. In high school, she played for Athol Murray College of Notre Dame. The team won the Western Shield Championship in 2002, and Slusar was captain of the team in 2003.

Hockey Canada
Slusar played for Team Canada on numerous occasions. She was a member of the Canadian National Under 22 team and played in the Air Canada Cup every year from 2003 to 2007. In November 2006, she played with Team Canada in the 4 Nations Cup. It was her international debut with the Canadian National Women's Team. She was selected to play for Canada at the 2010 Four Nations Cup.

Wisconsin Badgers
Slusar won 2 NCAA championships with the Wisconsin Badgers women's ice hockey program in 2006 and 2007. She was the Badgers team captain for the 2006–07 season.

Career stats
Note: GP= Games played; G= Goals; A= Assists; PTS = Points; PIM = Penalties in minutes; PPL = Power-play goals; SHG = Short-handed goals

Awards and honours
 Notre Dame Hounds MVP in 2002–03
 2005–06 NCAA All-Tournament Team
 2005–06 NCAA First Team All-American
 2005–06 WCHA First All-Star Team
 2005–06 WCHA Defensive Player of the year
Top Ten Finalist, 2006 Patty Kazmaier Award
 2006–07 NCAA Second Team All-American
 2006–07 WCHA Second All-Star Team
 2007 European Air Canada Cup, Tournament All-Star team
 CWHL Second All-Star Team, 2008–09 and 2009–10
 CWHL All-Rookie Team, 2007–08

References

External links
 
 

1985 births
Living people
Athol Murray College of Notre Dame alumni
Brampton Thunder players
Calgary Inferno players
Canadian women's ice hockey defencemen
Ice hockey people from Saskatchewan
People from Swift Current
Strathmore Rockies players
Wisconsin Badgers women's ice hockey players